The Chief of Safety of the United States Air Force is the commanding officer of the U.S. Air Force Safety Center.

List of Chiefs of Safety of the United States Air Force

See also
 Chief of Staff of the United States Air Force
 Chief of Chaplains of the United States Air Force

References

External links

United States Air Force

United States Air Force appointments